Fire Escape is an album by Sunburned Hand of the Man, released in 2007 on Smalltown Supersound Records and featuring production from Kieran Hebden.

2007 albums
Albums produced by Kieran Hebden